Beto Rockfeller is a Brazilian telenovela produced by TV Tupi and aired from November 4, 1968, to November 30, 1969. It was created by Cassiano Gabus Mendes, written by Bráulio Pedroso and directed by Lima Duarte and Walter Avancini.

Plot
Beto Rockfeller (played by Luiz Gustavo) is a charming, lower middle class shoes salesman who cons people into believing he is a millionaire by mixing himself with members of the high society of São Paulo.

Cast
Luis Gustavo - Beto Rockfeller
Bete Mendes - Renata
Débora Duarte - Lu
Ana Rosa - Cida
Irene Ravache - Neide
Walter Forster - Otávio
Plínio Marcos - Vitório
Maria Della Costa - Maitê
Marília Pêra - Manuela
Rodrigo Santiago - Carlucho
Yara Lins - Clô
Joffre Soares - Pedro
Eleonor Bruno - Rosa
Walderez de Barros - Mercedes
Ruy Rezende - Saldanha
Wladimir Nikolaief - Lavito
Heleno Prestes - Tavinho
Pepita Rodrigues - Bárbara
Marilda Pedroso - Mila
Renato Corte Real - Bertolo
Etty Fraser - madame Waleska
Alceu Nunez - Polidoro
Luís Ameríco - Tomás
Ester Mellingher - Tânia
Gésio Amadeu - Gésio
Zezé Motta - Zezé
Jayme Barcellos - Fernando 
Lourdes Moraes - Magda
Luísa Di Franco - Bia
Lima Duarte - Domingos / Duarte / Conde Vladimir / Secundino
Felipe Donavan - Delegado Moreno
Dias Barreto - Secundino / Domingos
João Carlos "Midnight" - Vadeco 
Theo De Faria - Lavinho
Francisco Trentini - Canuto
Othon Bastos

Relevance
Beto Rockfeller is often mentioned as a turning point for the telenovela format in Brazil. It abandoned the melodramatic, artificial tone of previous shows for a more naturalistic approach, with the presence of a morally ambiguous protagonist and the use of colloquial language; characters would often mention actual news and gossips of the time. It also was the first telenovela to use contemporary pop hit songs in its soundtrack, rather than purely orchestral music.

Movie
The telenovela was adapted into a 1970 motion picture directed by Olivier Perroy, with the main cast of the TV show.

Sequel
A Volta de Beto Rockfeller, a sequel, was aired from March 26, 1973, to November 9, 1973. It was not as successful as the original telenovela; yet it is noteworthy as Tupi's first telenovela produced in color.

External links
 

1968 telenovelas
Brazilian telenovelas
1968 Brazilian television series debuts
1969 Brazilian television series endings